The 1937 season was the eighth completed season of Finnish Football League Championship, known as the Mestaruussarja.

Overview

The 1937 Mestaruussarja  was contested by 8 teams, with HIFK Helsinki winning the championship. VIFK Vaasa and UL Turku were relegated to the second tier which was known as the Suomensarja.

League table

Results

See also
 1937 Suomensarja (Tier 2)

Footnotes

References

Mestaruussarja seasons
Fin
Fin
1937 in Finnish football